Warts and All: Volume 1 is the first volume in a collection of commercially released, full-concert live albums by the American jam band Moe. It was recorded live on February 28, 2001 at the Scranton Cultural Center in Scranton, Pennsylvania.

This set features the first released version of the live favorite, "Waiting For The Punchline", as well as "Crab Eyes" and "Kyle's Song", which predate their release on Wormwood by over a year.

Track listing
All tracks by Moe except where noted.

Disc one
"Intro" – 1:09
"Head" – 15:47
"The Ghost of Ralph's Mom" (also known as TGORM) – 4:36
"Nebraska" – 4:55
"Crab Eyes" – 10:22

Disc two
 "Moth" -> – 17:33
 "Timmy Tucker" – 30:39
 "Intro" – 0:53
 "Happy Hour Hero" -> – 15:13
 "Seat of My Pants" – 9:48

Disc three
 "Tambourine" – 8:37
 "Waiting for the Punchline" – 16:40
 "Kyle's Song" -> – 13:43
 "Meat" -> – 29:18
 "Moth" (reprise) – 1:46
 "Encore Intro" – 0:56
 "I Wanna Be Sedated" (Ramones cover)- 3:14

Personnel

Moe
Vinnie Amico – drums
Rob Derhak – bass, vocals
Chuck Garvey – guitar, vocals, illustrations
Jim Loughlin – percussion
Al Schnier – guitar, vocals

Technical 
Becca Childs Derhak – art direction, photography
Fred Kevorkian – mastering
Steve Young – mixing

References

Moe (band) live albums
2001 live albums